Snake coils is a descriptive term used by physical geologists and glaciologists to describe the "snake coil"-like shape that occurs along certain ablation lines. Essentially miniature tunnel valleys, the peculiar natural shapes were first described by French geologist Jean-Jerome Peytavi in 1973 during an expedition to northern Greenland, and later confirmed by a team of Danish geologists. It is believed that snake coils are formed through the same mechanism as tunnel valleys.

References
Benn, D.I. & Evans, D.J.A. Glaciers & Glaciation. Hodder Arnold Pubs; (1998).
Plummer, Charles C., Physical Geology. McGraw-Hill; 10 edition (2004).
Tarbuck, Edward J., Earth: An Introduction to Physical Geology. Prentice Hall; 8 edition (2004).

Snake coils (geology)